Jacqueline Buckingham Anderson is an American actress and entrepreneur. She is best known for her supporting roles in Half-Baked, Intimate affairs, and A Touch of Fate, her lead role in the movie Sleepless Nights. A society fixture in New York, she has also lived in Houston, Atlanta, Toronto, and Indianapolis.

Early life
Jacqueline Buckingham was born in suburban Cleveland, Ohio, and raised in Houston, Texas. Anderson attended Kingwood High School and was crowned Miss Houston Teen USA in 1992.

Career
Anderson began her acting career at the Equity Showcase Theatre in Toronto. Since then, she has had numerous roles in films such as Half-Baked, The Gypsy Years, and *Corpus Callosum. She had a supporting role of "Linda" in the Alan Rudolph film Intimate affairs starring Nick Nolte and Tuesday Weld, and played the role of "Betsy Kline" in the film A Touch of Fate starring Teri Hatcher.

Anderson appeared as special guest star "Sherry" in the NBC hit series Ed (TV series), appeared on the CBS series Hack (American TV series) in the role of "Marie", and made regular uncredited appearances as the girl who carried in the mail bag on the  Late Show with David Letterman. She played "Glenda Corcoran" on As the World Turns on CBS. Jacqueline also appeared as the Guest Star in "Ill-Conceived," an episode of Law & Order on NBC, playing the lead role of "Helene Zachary". 

Anderson hosted a documentary for OLN, and played the role of "Tiffany" in Jesus, Mary and Joey with Olympia Dukakis and Jennifer Esposito, and played opposite Minnie Driver in Portrait, a short feature which aired on amazon.com.

In Los Angeles in 2004, Anderson founded Design & Style Consulting LLC, a business focused on the art and fashion needs of a variety of corporate and individual clients.

After relocating with her family to Indianapolis, Indiana, she undertook large-scale photography installations at serial spaces belonging to Clarian Health.
she created photosforhealth.com, a company that puts photographs on hospital walls.  Her efforts were initially not without controversy, with some in the local art community claiming she was displacing the work of professional artists.

She launched Style Meets Life in 2008, a column and website assisting women with choices in their lives regarding personal presentation and fashion choices.

Personal life
In 1995, Anderson married museum director Maxwell L. Anderson. They were briefly divorced in 2013, before announcing their re-marriage three months later. They are now no longer married. She and Anderson have two children, Chase and Devon. As the first lady of several art museums, she made a name for herself in the New York Society circuit, culminating in 2003 in a two-page profile in W.  A year after the attack on the World Trade Center, her fashion sense was cited in the pages of The New York Times as embodying glamour's return.

The New York Times subsequently reported about her to illustrate the challenges recruiting spouses as part of professional recruitment for museum jobs.

References

External links
 
 Jacqueline Anderson at TV Guide

Living people
Emory University alumni
University of Toronto alumni
Actresses from Houston
American television hosts
American socialites
Beauty pageant contestants from Texas
21st-century American actresses
21st-century American businesspeople
21st-century American businesswomen
American film actresses
Actresses from Cleveland
American women television presenters
Year of birth missing (living people)